The Speedway Grand Prix of Italy (SGP) is a speedway event that is a part of the Speedway Grand Prix Series.

History
The first ever Italian SGP was held in the 1996 season and was won by Dane Hans Nielsen. The next SGP was held nine years later in 2005. The first five events were held at Santa Marina Stadium in Lonigo. From 2009 to 2013 the Italian SGP was hosted at Pista Olimpia Terenzano in Terenzano.

The 2021 SGP was cancelled due to the COVID-19 pandemic.

Results

Santa Marina Stadium, Lonigo

Pista Olimpia, Terenzano

References

See also 
 Sport in Italy

 
Italy
Recurring sporting events established in 1996
1996 establishments in Italy